Habgood is a surname. Notable people with the surname include:

Anthony Habgood (born 1946), British businessman
Ian Habgood (born 1974), English composer
John Habgood (1927–2019), Anglican archbishop
Francis Habgood (born 1964), Chief Constable of Thames Valley police

See also
Hagood (disambiguation)